Egale Canada (formerly Equality for Gays And Lesbians Everywhere) is an advocacy organization founded in 1986 by Les McAfee to advance equality for Canadian lesbian, gay, bisexual and transgender (LGBT) people and their families, across Canada.

The organization's current executive director is former Toronto politician Helen Kennedy. Past executive directors have included Gilles Marchildon, John Fisher and Kaj Hasselriis. Helen Kennedy is the first woman to head the organization.

Overview
Egale's work includes lobbying for more equitable laws for LGBT people, intervening in legal cases that affect human rights and equality, and increasing public education and awareness by providing information to individuals, groups, and media. Egale has over 3,300 members including people in every province and territory of Canada. Founded in 1986 by political activist Les McAfee, Egale Canada was incorporated as a federal not-for-profit organization in 1995, with a focus on education, advocacy, litigation and expert consultation.

The organization was initially named "Equality for Gays and Lesbians Everywhere". As they extended their efforts to include bisexual and transgender issues, they felt that the acronym was not inclusive enough, and therefore changed the name from the acronym E.G.A.L.E. to simply "Egale" (égale being the French word for "equal") in 2001. Egale Canada's partner organization, Egale Canada Human Rights Trust (ECHRT), was founded in 1995 as a charity dedicated to advancing LGBT human rights through education, research and community engagement.

Focus areas

Relationship recognition

Egale successfully lobbied for the introduction and passage of Bill C-23, which amended 68 federal statutes to provide same-sex couples with the same legal status as that of opposite-sex married couples. They also supported union activities and lobbied the federal government in support of equal employment benefits to those in same-sex relationships; coordinated coalitions of equality groups in cases on same-sex pension benefits and equal funeral leave for same-sex families.

Additionally, they have on two occasions challenged the legal definition of the word "spouse."  The first instance was when the group intervened before the Supreme Court of Canada to challenge the opposite-sex definition of "spouse" in the Old Age Security Act (Egan v. Canada).  Although the challenge was unsuccessful, it did set a unanimous precedent by which sexual orientation was henceforth entered into the Canadian Charter of Rights and Freedoms as a grounds for protection from discrimination.  The second challenge was successful, and revised the opposite-sex definition of "spouse" in Ontario's Family Law Act (M. v. H.) so that the right to common-law marriage extended to same-sex couples.

They also helped convince Statistics Canada to include same-sex families in the nationwide census, and worked with LEGIT to advance equal immigration rights for gays and lesbians.

Combating censorship and promoting freedom

Egale intervened to support efforts to have LGBT pride officially proclaimed in many cities; supported community initiatives in response to the Calgary bathhouse raids; decried the heavy-handed censorship practices of Canada Customs and helped Little Sisters Bookstore win their court case.  Egale has also supported freedom of speech for people with anti-gay points of view, including Albertan pastor Stephen Boissoin, who was found guilty by the Alberta Human Rights Commission of exposing gays to hatred. Part of the ruling was financial compensation paid to Egale as requested by the complainant Darren Lund (who is not homosexual), but Egale refused to accept the money.

Helping create safer schools

In 2007 Egale commissioned a survey of 3,700 high school students from across Canada in order to gain data on the situation of LGBT students in Canadian schools and gain insight into the level of homophobia and transphobia in schools. The final report, entitled Every Class in Every School, was released in 2011.

Responding to data discovered in the report which indicates that schools with a gay-straight alliance are seen and felt as being more supportive Egale created the mygsa.ca website. The site provides an online community and resources for students who wish to start or maintain a gay-straight alliance in their school. The site also provides resources for faculty and parents who wish to support LGBT students.

Egale has also supported a number of legal challenges involving the rights of youth in the education system, especially the case of Marc Hall who wanted to bring a same-sex date to his prom; fought against the ban by the Surrey School Board of books depicting same-sex families.

Human rights protection and combating hate crimes

Egale successfully lobbied the federal government to add "sexual orientation" to the Canadian Human Rights Act to protect lesbians, gays and bisexuals from discrimination; lent support to many provincial and territorial efforts to have equal rights enshrined in legislation across the country; lobbied the Government to introduce more severe penalties for those convicted of gay-bashing and other hate crimes; supported the addition of "sexual orientation" to the grounds covered by hate propaganda legislation; intervened in the Nixon case to support the rights of transgender people.

In 2007, responding to the suicide of an LGBT youth because of homophobic bullying, Egale created the Report Homophobic Violence, Period (RHVP) program in conjunction with the Toronto Police Service. RHVP is a reporting, public awareness and education program that focuses on youth ages 13 to 25 and addresses the issue of homophobic and transphobic bullying and violence.

Community outreach and public education

They developed fact sheets on current issues affecting the LGBT communities; established a Website and manages six e-mail discussion groups to help keep our communities informed across the country; hosted an historic national conference in Montreal (Rainbow Visions); testified before the Canadian Radio-television and Telecommunications Commission in support of diversity in Canada's broadcasting policy and to oppose the limitation of access to lesbian and gay materials on the Internet through restrictive regulations; presented to the plenary session of the United Nations World Conference on Human Rights in Vienna and participated in the Fourth World Conference on Women in Beijing.

Controversies

Immigration issue
Egale blamed the Conservative government for allegedly failing to help gay immigrants from countries that have anti-gay laws, such as Iran, Iraq, Malaysia, Jordan, Mexico and Nicaragua. As of 2017, 72 countries still criminalize LGBTQ activity.

Bill C-2
In 2005, the organization was criticized by some of Canada's gay press for failing to submit a brief, after indicating an intention to do so, to the Canadian House of Commons Standing Committee on Justice and Human Rights regarding the potential impact on LGBT communities of Bill C-2, a controversial piece of legislation that revised the age of sexual consent. Xtra! asserted that Egale was devoting so much time and effort to advocacy around same-sex marriage that it was missing the boat on other important issues.

Leadership Award
In 2009, Egale Canada presented Jaime Watt, a political strategist in the government of former Premier of Ontario Mike Harris, with its inaugural Leadership Award in honour of his role in supporting the provincial law that granted common-law marriage rights to same-sex couples. The decision was denounced by some LGBT activists because of Watt's role in some other government policies that had been unpopular within the gay community.

See also

LGBT rights in Canada
List of LGBT rights organisations

References

Further reading

Archival holdings
Égale Canada - Canadian Political Parties and Political Interest Groups - Web Archive created by the University of Toronto Libraries

External links
Egale Canada

Organizations established in 1986
LGBT political advocacy groups in Canada
1986 establishments in Ontario
Non-profit organizations based in Toronto